The Town Ground in Rushden is a cricket ground which was used by Northamptonshire County Cricket Club in  22 first-class matches for 39 years between 1924 and 1963. It is now used predominantly for Northamptonshire Premier League games, serving as the home ground of 2015 Northamptonshire Cricket League Premier Division Champions Rushden and Higham Town Cricket Club since 2003.

Records
 Lowest team total: 66 by Northamptonshire v Worcestershire, 1939
 Highest individual score: 141 by NW Hill for Nottinghamshire against Northamptonshire, 1961
 Highest partnership: 192 by NW Hill and G Millman for the second wicket in Nottinghamshires innings against Northamptonshire, 1961
 Best bowling in an innings: 9-53 by JH Cornford for Sussex against Northamptonshire, 1949
 Best Bowling in a match: 12-74 by RTD Perks for Worcestershire against Northamptonshire, 1948

References

Cricket grounds in Northamptonshire
Rushden
Sports venues completed in 1924